Jean-Loup Waldspurger (born 1953) is a French mathematician working on the Langlands program and related areas. He proved Waldspurger's theorem, the Waldspurger formula, and the local Gan–Gross–Prasad conjecture for orthogonal groups. He played a role in the proof of the fundamental lemma, reducing the conjecture to a version for Lie algebras. This formulation was ultimately proven by Ngô Bảo Châu.

Education
Waldspurger attained his doctorate at École normale supérieure in 1980, under supervision of Marie-France Vignéras.

Scientific work 
J.-L. Waldspurger's work concerns the theory of automorphic forms. He highlighted the links between Fourier coefficients of modular shapes of half full weight and function values L or periods of modular shapes of full weight. With C. Moeglin, he demonstrated Jacquet's conjecture describing the discrete spectrum of the GL(n) groups. Other works are devoted to orbital integrals on p-adic groups: unipotent orbital integrals, proof of the conjecture of Langlands-Shelstad transfer conditional on the "fundamental lemma" (which was later proved by Ngo-Bao-Chau). J.-L. Waldspurger proved the Gross-Prasad conjecture for SO(N) groups on a p-adic field. With C. Moeglin, he wrote two large volumes establishing the stable trace formula for twisted spaces.

Some recent publications are available on its website.

Awards
He was awarded the 2009 Clay Research Award for his results in p-adic harmonic analysis. He was elected as a member of French Academy of Sciences in 2017.

References

Jean-Loup Waldspurger, Mathématicien 

1953 births
Living people
École Normale Supérieure alumni
20th-century French mathematicians
21st-century French mathematicians
Place of birth missing (living people)
Clay Research Award recipients
Members of the French Academy of Sciences